Cross Roads is an unincorporated community in Douglas County, Missouri, United States. Cross Roads is in the southwest corner of the county on Missouri Route DD, west of Missouri Route 76. It is located on the edge of the Mark Twain National Forest.

History
A post office called Cross Roads was established in 1909, and remained in operation until 1959. The community was named after the intersection at the original town site.

References

Unincorporated communities in Douglas County, Missouri
1909 establishments in Missouri
Unincorporated communities in Missouri